Sebastian Díaz may refer to:

 Sebastian Diaz Morales (born 1975), Argentine visual artist
 Sebastian Díaz (footballer, born 1983), Uruguayan football centre-back
 Sebastián Díaz (footballer, born 1996), Chilean football defensive midfielder